Livoberezhna is a railway stop that is located in Kyiv, Ukraine. It is part of the Kyiv Directorate of Southwestern Railways.

Railway stations in Kyiv
Southwestern Railways stations
Railway stations opened in 2011
2011 establishments in Ukraine